Fazal Malik Akif (born 22 October 1947) is a Pakistani singer and songwriter, who gained popularity in the 1970s for introducing a modern and eclectic twist to traditional Pashto folk compositions. He is widely regarded as the first "pathan pop star" for collaborating indigenous instruments such as the rubab, harmonium and tabla with contemporary synthesizers, accordion, drums and electric guitar. He typically sang in his native language of Pashto, but his repertoire extends to Urdu, Punjabi, Hindko, Sindhi, Balochi, Saraiki and Farsi.

Unlike other Pashtun performers of his time, Akif adopted an exuberant and expressive style on stage, which led to him being labelled a "game changer" of the Pashto music scene. Due to the romantic nature of his lyrics he was considered a heartthrob and built a large female following. His energetic engagement with audiences broke Pashtun music traditions and often caused mayhem and mass hysteria.

Recognised for his exceptionally deep voice, Akif has been credited for altering the face of conventional Pashto folk music. His musical influences include K.L. Saigal, Pankaj Mullick, Jagmohan, C.H. Atma and Mukesh.

Akif overcame resistance by traditionalists of his era and is amongst the most distinct artists to have risen from the Pashto music industry.

Early and personal life
Akif was born in Kohat, Pakistan in 1947. Born Fazal-e-Malik, he added the pen name "Akif" in 1971 when he came across the word in Islamic literature. Akif derives from the word "I'tikaf", loosely translated as "someone who cannot be moved".

His father Fazal Karim Asif was a prominent lawyer and mother Zubaida Khanum was a housewife.

Akif is the third of seven siblings and describes himself as a "misfit" growing up. But he always maintained a close relationship with his father, a highly academic man and descendant of the Kamboh (Zubairi) tribe. Akif's father studied Law at the renowned Aligarh Muslim University in Uttar Pradesh, India and represented elite clientele across India and Pakistan. During his youth, Akif's father was an avid political activist, arrested and jailed on several occasions for picketing against alcohol distribution in the country. Akif's father was also a senior member of Muhammad Ali Jinnah's Muslim League party and is documented in the publication, "Quaid-e-Azam aur Sarhad" or "Quaid-e-Azam and his land" for playing an integral role in the independence of Pakistan in 1947.

As a child, Akif was heavily influenced by his father's intellectual reputation and completed a law degree at Peshawar University to fulfill his father's wishes. However, he never possessed a passion for the subject and regularly got into altercations with his university professors over the ethics of man-made law.

After completing his degree, Akif handed the certificate to his father and declared his intention to continue his music career. However, upon his father's strict insistence, Akif put his plans on hold and worked as a lawyer, notary public and oath commissioner for several years. Akif struggled with his conscience when taking on cases he did not believe in and often lost out on fees by referring clients to colleagues or competitor law firms. Throughout his time studying and practising Law, Akif's love for performing arts never escaped him, and he eventually dropped the profession to pursue a career in music full-time.

Akif's father died in 1985 and his mother in 2008.

Akif had a love marriage to one of his fans, Sirat Malik (died 2004) from Rawalpindi, Pakistan. Sirat, who did not speak nor understand Pashto, wrote to Akif after seeing him perform on television. While touring the Punjab region of Pakistan, Akif visited Sirat's workplace to surprise her. They fell in love, married and have two children, a son Mohammad Ali Khan and a daughter Namsi Nāmūs Khan.

Career

Early work: 1964–1969
Akif's first stage performance was at high school. Known to be an aloof, angry and introverted young man who kept himself to himself, Akif only agreed to perform on the insistence of his head-teacher who had identified Akif's talent for performing arts. Akif agreed to sing on the condition that he remained behind the stage curtains and did not have to face the audience. He nervously performed with his eyes closed and finished his performance to see a standing ovation and the curtains lifted. The audience's positive reaction encouraged Akif to continue performing.

Akif made his official singing debut in 1964 on Peshawar Radio Station on a programme titled, "University Magazine". By now, Akif had gained popularity for his confident delivery of several stage performances in college and was selected alongside other talented students for the radio show. He travelled from Kohat to Peshawar to attend the two-day competition.

Akif's primary passion was acting and he had prepared a drama skit as his audition piece. However, the radio station producers encouraged Akif to sing a classical Urdu song instead. With no preparation, Akif chose to perform "Na Hui Gar Mere Marne Se Tasalli" a complicated ghazal by Mirza Ghalib, originally sung by the Indian movie playback singer Mukesh. When Akif began to sing, the radio producers were taken by the quality of the teen's untrained voice, and selected him for both the drama and singing segments of the competition.

Soon Akif was being introduced to music producers across Peshawar and was offered opportunities to sing on live radio. His first live Pashto performance was on Peshawar Radio Station in 1965, which led to him receiving offers from producers from across the province. As Hindko was his first language, Akif taught himself to read Pashto and often, due to time constraints, learnt songs verbatim by listening to them repeatedly.

From 1964 to 1969 Akif performed regularly on Peshawar Radio Station and gained increasing popularity for re-inventing Ashraf Maftoon's songs with his own compositions. He gained much acclaim for his rendition of the sentimental ballad, "Zargay Mey Laywanai De", in which Akif slurred, hiccupped and sang like a drunkard, sniggering at the hopelessness of his lovelorn fate.

By the end of 1969, television producers had caught on to Akif's growing fan base and he was invited to perform on television.

Rise to stardom: 1970–1974
Akif performed on television for the first time on the talent show "Naye Funkaar" in Rawalpindi, Pakistan in September 1969. The show invited contestants from East Pakistan, now Bangladesh, and Pakistan to showcase their musical, singing, dancing and drama abilities in front of a panel of judges. Akif, still determined to pursue his passion for acting, had prepared a drama sketch as his audition piece. However, due to encouragement from Agha Nasir, the General manager of the television channel, Akif was put forward to also sing.

Razia Sultana, a television producer and panel judge took Akif aside after his drama audition and encouraged him to sing in Pashto for the singing segment. Despite his apprehension he performed a rendition of the Pashto song "Turah Chay Tairaigy" and won first place in the competition.

It was around this time Akif won the interest of renowned Pathan poet Ahmed Faraz. The two men forged a close friendship and regularly spent evenings together discussing their poetry and lyrics.

In the years following, Akif went on to perform on various television shows including, "Aaghosh-e-Kohistan", loosely meaning "from the lap of the mountains", "Lok Tamasha", "Lok Mela", "Lok Virsa" and "Nandara". Akif represented North-West Frontier Province, now Khyber Pakthunkhwa, regularly alongside established artists from other provinces, performing often as the star attraction on Pakistan Television and other regional channels.

Soon, Akif's fan base spilled across the border into Afghanistan, and his songs were granted increased radio airtime. Akif regularly travelled to Afghanistan to record songs on Radio Afghanistan in Kabul and to cater to the demand of his growing fan base. Here Akif met and produced songs with Qamar Gula's husband Mohammad Din Zakhil, a harmonium player and Gul Alam, a noted tabla player, who was also Nashenas's personal musician at the time.

In 1974, a 27-year-old Akif was invited by Chaklala Television to sing alongside Naheed Akhtar, Tahira Syed and Roshan Ara Begum, three senior figures of the music industry, for the show "Mehfil". However, Akif was vehemently against performing duets and perceived such requests to be insults to his artistic individuality. He rejected producers' requests for him to sing with Tahira Syed, and instead sang a solo of Qateel Shifai's song, "Gungunati Si Koi Raat Bhi Aajati Hai". The producers reformatted the track as if Akif was serenading Tahira Syed. Known for his fiery temperament, Akif argued with the producers for not complying with his wishes and for falsely representing his version of the song.

Akif's temperament
Akif was known industry-wide for his angry disposition and principled nature. During a live television show in 1978 at "Lok Tamasha" in Shakarparian, Islamabad, Akif stopped mid-performance. Due to faulty technical equipment Akif was seen gesturing to Azhar Lodhi, the presenter and Tufail Niazi, the director that he was unable to hear the music properly. When they signalled for him to continue, Akif lost his temper, and in an act of rage kicked a prop stool into the air, threw his microphone to the ground and walked off stage.

On another occasion in 1988, at a patriotic concert organised for Pakistan government's chief guests and ministers at Liaquat Memorial Hall, Rawalpindi, Akif refused to sing in a group behind lead singer, Shaukat Ali. He ignored the producer's instructions and left the venue from the back exit during the performance, resulting in a three-month ban from the music scene. However, this became a turning point in Akif's career as his comeback track "Zam Da Husn Jazeero Ta" went on to become one of his most successful releases.

Akif was regularly banned from television throughout his career for submitting scathing interviews to publications with complaints about the music industry's lack of creativity and unwillingness to experiment.

An established artist
Although Akif was primarily a Pashto singer, he possessed wide crossover appeal and gained popularity in non-Pashto speaking regions of Pakistan.

In 1982, music director and close friend, Sohail Rana of Shalimar Recording Company invited Akif to Karachi to produce an album in Urdu. On arrival, one of Akif's most notable performances was at the Ali Bhai Auditorium where Kamal Irani the presenter of the show lost control of the frenzied crowd and had to have the lights switched off so Akif could escape the building unscathed.

Akif performed in various venues in Karachi, however, the opportunity to record an album never materialised. Despite Sohail Rana's persistence Akif refused to commit to an album, choosing instead to return to Kohat for the birth of his son, Mohammad Ali Khan.

Akif's distinctive singing style had started to garner interest in India. So profound was his impact that according to an article published in the Frontier Post, "Frontier's Voice with a touch of Saigal" by Afzal Hussain Bokhari, Akif was a favourite of Bollywood film actor Raj Kapoor. When Kapoor came across Akif's audio cassette he was so impressed he likened Akif's voice to that of his close friend Mukesh, and insisted Akif be invited to Bombay as a vocalist for his future films.

That same year, at a blood donation charity event organised by the Fatimid Foundation at Pearl Continental Hotel in Peshawar, Pakistan, guest of honour and film actor Dilip Kumar is said to have approached Akif after his performance. Kumar took Akif aside to compliment him for his energetic delivery and deep voice. As a fellow Pathan, he especially praised Akif for his bold representation of their people in the music industry.

In 1985, Akif and Ghulam Ali, who affectionately referred to Akif as "vakeel sahib" or "Mr. Lawyer", were asked to sing a set of private performances at the Marriott Hotel, Islamabad. Akif also performed alongside Mehdi Hassan and Farida Khanum at the annual Doctor's Association event in Peshawar, which was attended by the Pakistani film actor Mohammad Ali. He has also performed on shows along with Alamgir, Munni Begum, Akhlaq Ahmed, Tina Sani and Mahjabeen Qizilbash.

In the late 1980s, Akif twice toured the Middle East including Dubai, Abu Dhabi, Sharjah and Qatar, alongside actresses and dancers Parveen Babi, Sonia and Rukhsana, as well as actors Badar Munir and Asif Khan, to showcase his music to a wider audience. At one particular performance in Dubai, his female back-up dancers gave such an impassioned performance that the wooden stage floor had to be mopped to clear the blood from their bare feet.

To meet the growing demand from his female fans, Akif was regularly requested to attend private functions. At an event organised by the International Women's Association in Peshawar, Akif performed alongside Asad Amanat Ali Khan and Khyal Mohammad. When Akif took to the stage, the female audience broke into rapturous screams and applause, many of them standing on their seats in an attempt to gain Akif's attention. On leaving the venue Akif was swarmed by his female fans, several of them requesting his autograph on high value rupee notes with the promise of never spending them.

Akif was regularly invited to judge local talent shows and particularly made appearances at school competitions to inspire young children. To this day Akif is impersonated in Pakistani talent competitions, with aspiring stars mimicking his signature voice and black beard.

Voice
Akif is known for his bass, thick and baritone voice. During his early years of performing on the radio, Akif was frequently mistaken to be a much older and heavier man. His female fan base grew following his performances on television, with hordes of women sending letters to local newspapers, radio stations and television channels requesting Akif's personal contact details and hand in marriage.

Western recognition: 1990–1994

During a trip to Peshawar in 1990, Anne Hunt of World Circuit Records, came across Akif at a show at Nishtar Hall, Peshawar. Anne Hunt and Mary Farquharson, of what was then Arts Worldwide, were in search of musicians who were popular locally but little known to the wider western public. Hunt was seeking artists that encompassed musical excellence in their respective genres, and saw in Akif a global star relevant for the western music market. Hunt organised for Akif and his band, Walidad on tabla, Aman Shah on dholak, Musafir on harmonium and Amir Hamza on rubab, to travel to the United Kingdom as part of the "Jashan-e-Bahar" festival from the 7–21 March 1991, alongside other artists including Abida Parveen, Aziz Mian, Zarsanga, Allan Fakir and Farida Khanum. On arrival in the United Kingdom in March 1991, Akif performed with his band in various cities including venues in Hackney and Greenwich in London, Manchester and Birmingham. He was interviewed on BBC radio and TV Asia, and went on to perform on Channel 4 for the series Mahfil.

Akif headlined along with Hangama and Farishta on 26 April 1992 for the Afghan Festival. He also regularly performed at charity concerts, including an event at Ganesh Hall, London in support of the Guyana Care centre.

In April 1994, Akif was invited as the honorary guest to the launch of Safeer magazine. The event took place at Sanam restaurant in Manchester and was hosted by the magazine's chief editor, Mohammad Azhar. A review of Akif's future Eid show performance went on to feature in the magazine.

On 22 October 1994, his 47th birthday, Akif headlined at the Gracie Fields Theatre in Rochdale, Lancashire as part of the North West Asian Talents Promotion event. This is believed to be one of Akif's final live performances.

Retirement
Akif decided to remain in the United Kingdom with the intention of producing more musical material for his next album. However, his family circumstances forced him to retire from the music business. During his retirement Akif went on to host various radio programmes on Asian Sound and Kismat radio stations.

Despite repeated requests for him to return to Pakistan, he decided not to return at the time and is remembered as having disappeared from the music industry at the peak of his career.

Return to Pakistan: 2003
In 2003, Akif finally returned to Pakistan after a thirteen-year hiatus and was embraced by the music fraternity. Peshawar Television Centre produced a one-off comeback programme titled Yaad Girina where Akif spoke on his musical career and performed a series of his hit songs. The show was attended by an audience of old musical associates and friends, which included producers, directors, composers, performers and lyricists such as Mohammad Azam Azam. The programme ended with a 56-year-old Akif performing his famous song "Zam Da Husn Jazeero Ta" in a split screen format displaying him singing the same song years earlier at Nishtar Hall, Peshawar.

Present
Now residing in Manchester, Akif focuses on writing and painting. His two children have established a production company, which aims to promote a collection of his released and unreleased songs, along with an anthology of Akif's poetry.

On 26 August 2016, Coke Studio uploaded a contemporary rendition of Akif's song "Dilruba Na Raazi" on their YouTube channel. Performed and further composed by Zeb Bangash, Faakhir Mehmood and Strings, the song is a huge hit and has garnered millions of views.

Awards and nominations
Akif was first nominated for the Pakistan Television Awards in 1986 in the category of "Outstanding Performance". He went on to win the 1987–1988 Khyber Award for "Best Singer" at a ceremony in Nishtar Hall, Peshawar. He was also nominated in three separate years for Pakistan Television's National Music Awards in the category of "Best Singer", once losing out to Abida Parveen.

In 1987, Akif competed at "Lok Mela" in Islamabad, coming second to Pakistani gypsy folk singer Zarsanga. In the weeks ensuing Akif initiated legal action against "Lok Mela" for vote rigging. In response, Adam Nayyar, Executive Director of "Lok Virsa" replied acknowledging that Akif was indeed the best performer in terms of stage performance, public popularity and singing. Nayyar went on to invite Akif to sit on the UNESCO Advisory Board as a cultural ambassador, a position Akif declined out of principle.

The Ministry of Culture of North-West Frontier Province recommended Akif for the "Pride of Performance" award for three consecutive years from 1988 to 1991.

Discography

Akif sang hundreds of songs throughout his career and released some of his tracks on vinyl, as well as releasing EP's through EMI Pakistan Ltd. Recording Company in Pashto and Sindhi.

Due to high demand from Akif's fans for an official album, in 1988 he released Zama Meena or My Love through Odeon Records in cassette format. The album was well received and embraced for its upbeat pop flavour and use of western instruments. Akif had little involvement with the production of the album and was unhappy with the sound quality and balancing of his voice upon its release.

He put all his efforts into producing his next album, Baraan Wai Baraan (translated Rain Oh Rain), which was released in 1990 and became a commercial success.

Zama Meena
Side A – Dilruba Na Raazi, Lag May Da Husn, Ze Yo Patang, Laila Da Bungro Shrang Day, Kahin Chan Chan Churiya (Urdu)

Side B – Meena Meena Meena Bus, Sheeno, Saqi Se La Bundaway, Sur Salu Pa Sar, Meena Kay Mayan, Mastay Mangay

Baraan Wai Baraan
Side A – Baraan Wai Baraan, Ma Waaya Bia Bia, Moray, Da Ghudar Ghara

Side B – Kha Shwa Laila, Raaka Saqi Raaka, Ashna Waaday, Nun Da Skalo Ehtimaam, Raasha Janana Zama

Press and articles
Throughout his career, Akif's photographs graced the covers of various months on yearly calendars.

Some of the known press and articles that Akif has been featured in or contributed to are;

1970s
 Khyber Mail (North-West Frontier Province's only English publication) – Announcement about Akif's upcoming performance on 5 June at the Khyber Intercontinental, Peshawar. Akif was performing alongside Chakori and The Inspirations band, 4 June 1976, back cover
 Ikhbara Film, article about Fazal Malik Akif, December 1977
 Daily Hurriyat Karachi, article about Fazal Malik Akif, June 1978, page 1-2
 Funkaar Naama, article titled, "Fazal Malik ka usool hai kay wo doh gaana kabhi nahi gaatay", November 1978

1980s
 Daily Mashriq newspaper, Fazal Malik Akif noted as a speaker in public speaking event, 19 January 1984, page 3
 The Frontier Post, article titled, "Frontier's voice with a touch of Saigal" by Afzal Hussain Bokhari, 13 December 1986, page 3
 Gulf Weekly magazine, article titled, "I could have made millions" by Neena Gopal, 3 July 1987, page 13
 TV Tempo International magazine, article by Farida Noor, April 1988, page 86-88
 Awaz Peshawar, article titled, "Fazal Malik Akif ki duniya mein", September 1989, page 2
 Fortnightly Faasla (member of Audit Bureau of Circulations, London), article titled, "Munfarad gulokaar, Fazal Malik Akif" by Salman Amir, edition 31, page 56-57
 Fortnightly Faasla (member of Audit Bureau of Circulations, London), letters written by fans for a collection of famous personalities including; Mehdi Hassan, Rekha, Anil Kapoor, Chunky Pandey, Aamir Khan, Raaj Kumar, Vinod Khanna, Govinda, Juhi Chawla and Fazal Malik Akif, article titled, "Aap kay paighaam sitaaron kay naam", page 48
 Film Asia magazine, article titled, "Madhur awaaz ka malik, Fazal Malik Akif. Das zabaano mein gaanay vala gulokaar" by Amjad Aziz Malik, page 89-92

1990s
 The Jiddat Daily Peshawar newspaper, article about Fazal Malik Akif, 19 May 1990
 Awaz Peshawar, article about Fazal Malik Akif, September 1990, page 1
 The Daily Jang London, article titled, "Jashan-e-Bahar", 9 and 10 March 1991, page 1-2
 The Daily Jang London, article titled, "Songs of love and war" by Jang correspondent, 21 March 1991, page 6
 The Daily Jang London, article titled, "Zarsanaga and Fazal-e-Malik Akif – Tradition and Innovation from Pakistan's Frontier" by Trevor Parsons, 23 and 24 March 1991, page 6
 The Daily Jang London, article titled, "Manchester mein Pashto tanzeem", 30 January 1994, page 10
 The Daily Jang London, article titled, "Statement about North-West Frontier Province" by Fazal Malik Akif, 14 February 1994, page 3
 Safeer magazine, article about Fazal Malik Akif's performance at Sanam restaurant in Manchester, July–September 1994, page 85
 The Daily Jang London, article titled, "Hak tau ye hai kay hak ki baat karo" by Fazal Malik Akif, 21 March 1995, page 6

Other publications
Akif was a regular contributor to Aatish newspaper and Aina magazine between 1992 and 1995. His most notable submissions were his many shairs and nazams which included "Inqilaab aur Jihad", "Aaj ka Musalmaan" and "Aay mairay watan".

Akif was also mentioned in various publications in Pakistan and Afghanistan, including Weekly Mussawar, a Lahore newspaper, Akhbar Khawateen and Hamlal. Some of the known articles are;

 "Sarhad kay gulokaar"
 "Khumaar bhari aankhein"
 "Pakistan ka nojavaan shaair"
 "A singer like this is born once in a lifetime"
 "Main insaan kay banai huay kanoon ko nahi maanta"

2017
 The Express Tribune, article titled, "Singer Fazal Malik Akif claims 'Dilruba Na Raazi' is his original; asks Faakhir for apology" by Rahul Aijaz, 2 February 2017
 Parhlo.com, article titled, "Coke Studio's Dilruba Na Raazi Might Have Been Copied And The Singer's Daughter Seems Angry!" by Daniyal Shahid, 3 February 2017

References

External links
 Fazal Malik Akif's official YouTube channel

1947 births
Living people
20th-century Pakistani male singers
Pakistani songwriters
Pashtun people
Pakistani emigrants to the United Kingdom